The Krebsgraben is a river of Saxony, Germany. It flows into the White Elster near Leipzig.

See also
List of rivers of Saxony

Rivers of Saxony
Rivers of Germany